Zemach is a surname. Notable people with the surname include:

Eddy Zemach (1935–2021), Israeli philosopher
Margot Zemach (1931–1989), American illustrator
  (1887-1939), Jewish stage actor and director, founder of Habima Theatre
Rita Zemach (1926–2015), American statistician
Shlomo Zemach (1886–1974), Israeli author, agriculturalist, and Zionist pioneer

Idit Zemach